Isabel's Choice is a 1981 American made-for-television drama film directed by Guy Green, starring Jean Stapleton, Richard Kiley, Peter Coyote and Betsy Palmer. It was broadcast on CBS as The CBS Wednesday Night Movie on December 16, 1981.

Synopsis
Isabel Cooper (Jean Stapleton) is a widow who prides herself on her years of devotion and loyalty as secretary to Lyman James (Richard Kiley), a top executive in a large corporation. Lyman retires when a dynamic young executive, Wynn Thomas (Peter Coyote) is hired to assume the presidency Lyman thought would be his. Under Thomas' presidency, Isabel is promoted to an executive position that she had worked towards for several years. Lyman later seeks comfort in Isabel when his wife is killed suddenly in a plane crash. As Lyman and Isabel's relationship progresses, he plans to propose and assumes that she will end her career to stay home with him. Isabel is forced to choose between the executive life she worked so hard to establish and the comforts of marriage that Lyman is willing to offer.

Cast
Jean Stapleton as Isabel Cooper
Richard Kiley as Lyman Jones
Peter Coyote as Wynn Thomas
Betsy Palmer as Ellie Fineman
Mildred Dunnock as Helen
Sally Kemp as Miss Hamilton
Irene Tedrow as Mrs. Harper
Douglas Robinson as Supervisor
Howard Morton as Miles

Home media release
The film was released on VHS in 1989 by Bridgestone Multimedia Group and has long been out of print. To date, it has not been released on DVD.

References

External links

1981 television films
1981 films
1981 drama films
CBS network films
Films directed by Guy Green
American drama television films
1980s English-language films
1980s American films